Hildy is a given name, usually feminine. It may refer to:

 Hildy Gloom, the antagonist of The 7D. Voiced by Kelly Osbourne.
 Hildy Kuryk (born 1977), Director of Communications for Vogue magazine and former National Finance Director of the Democratic National Committee
 Hildy Parks (1926–2004), American actress
 Hildy Johnson, a protagonist of the 1928 Broadway play The Front Page and various adaptations, sometimes male, sometimes female
 Hildy, a main character in the 1944 Broadway musical On the Town and the 1949 film adaptation